Aisi or AISI may refer to:

Organizations
 African Information Society Initiative of UNECA
 Alberta Initiative for School Improvement
 American Iron and Steel Institute
 Agenzia Informazioni e Sicurezza Interna, the internal intelligence agency of Italy

Other uses
Aisi language
Hazaaron Khwaishein Aisi
Robert Guba Aisi